Country Town is a 1971 Australian drama film directed by Peter Maxwell, produced by Fenton Rosewarne and starring Terry McDermott, Gary Gray and Lynette Curran. It was a film version of the Australian television series Bellbird, written by Barbara Vernon.

Plot
A severe drought strikes the town of Bellbird. Young reporter Philip Henderson arrives and stirs old tensions. The locals rally together and hold a fund-raising gymkhana.

Cast
 Terry McDermott  – Max Pearson
 Gary Gray – David Emerson
 Lynette Curran – Rhoda Wilson
 Gerard Maguire – Philip Henderson
 Sue Parsons – Jean Fowler
 Carl Bleazby – Jim Emerson
 Maurie Fields – John Quinney
 Carmel Millhouse – Marge Bacon
 Brian Anderson – Stan Bacon
 Margaret Cruickshank – Doctor Liz
 Mark Albiston – Bob Wright
 Kirsty Child – Julie
 Frank Rich  – Giorgio Lini
 Rosie Sturgess – Anna Maria Lini
 Kurt Ludescher – Grossark
 Sheila Florance – Old Mrs Bacon

Production
The film was made in January 1971 during a break in production from filming the TV series. Although most of the regular cast were involved and the script was written by Barbara Vernon, who was one of the main writers on the show, the ABC was not formally involved in production. The movie was the idea of two regular cast members, Gary Gray and Terry McDermott who formed a production company, Avargo, with Fenton Rosewarne, an ABC film editor, and Rod Barnett, a chartered accountant. English director Peter Maxwell, who had extensive experience of working in Australia, was hired to direct.

The film was shot on 16mm over four weeks on a $70,000 budget starting late January 1971. Yea in Victoria was the main location with drought scenes shot in Wentworth, New South Wales. After editing was completed the Australian Film Development Corporation provided $15,000 to help prepare 35 mm prints.

Release
The film was distributed by Gray and McDermott themselves, released first in country areas then reaching Sydney in 1973.

References

External links

Country Town at Oz Movies

1971 films
1971 drama films
Films directed by Peter Maxwell
Australian drama films
1970s English-language films
1970s Australian films
English-language drama films